Batman Province is a province in Turkey. It was created in May 1990 with the Law No. 3647 taking some parts from the eastern Province of Siirt and some from the southern Province of Mardin. The province had a population of 626,319 in 2021 and its current governor is Hulusi Şahin.

The province is considered part of Turkish Kurdistan and has a Kurdish majority with a large Arab minority found in the northern parts of the province (Sason and Kozluk) and Hasankeyf.

History
The Batman Province contains the strategic Tigris river with fertile lands by its sides, as well as rocky hills with numerous caves providing a natural shelter. Therefore, it was inhabited from prehistoric times, likely from the Neolithic (Paleolithic) period, according to archeological evidence. First documented evidence of settlements in the province dates back to 7th century BC. An artificial "island" was created in this marshy area. It was named Elekhan, and had an independent status for 194 years from 546 BC till the invasion of Alexander the Great in 334 BC. The Batman Province was a religious center in the 4th–6th centuries AD and a part of the Byzantine Empire. In the 11th–12th centuries it was ruled by the Great Seljuq Empire and Artuqids, a part of which was based in the province, in the city of Hasankeyf. The city is a cultural center of the Batman Province and as such was declared as a natural conservation area in 1981.

Around 4th–6th centuries AD the province became an outpost of the Silk Road. It was populated by Assyrian (Non-Syriac) Christians and Armenians, also had a significant presence of Pontic Greeks, Baghdadi Jews.
Significant changes in the language and management of the province were brought in 1515 by Mahmoud Pasha Elekhani. It is believed that a variant of his name, Elah, was transformed into Iluh and gave the old name to Batman city.

From July 1987 to October 1997 Batman Province was included in the OHAL state of emergency region.

Development of oil fields resulted in relocation of Turkish people into a mostly Kurd-populated Batman Province. This brought ethnic conflicts which escalated in 1990s. More than 180 civilians were killed in the Batman city area by unidentified gunmen between 1992 and 1993. The province became a stronghold of the Turkish Hezbollah and it was reported that Batman hosted a camp where the militants received military and political training.

Recent individual incidents include the following: 1 Turkish soldier was killed and 2 wounded during clashes in the province on 15 April 2010. One Turkish soldier was killed and 2 injured after a Kurdistan Workers' Party (PKK) attack on a Turkish military outpost on 7 July 2010. Four Kurdish civilians were killed on 1 August 2010 after their vehicle struck a roadside bomb. Later on 9 August 2010 5 PKK militants were killed in clashes with the Turkish military.

Geography 
It lies in a mountainous area with the average elevation of 550 meters which contains several thousands of caves. The tallest mountains are Sason Dağları (2500 m), Meleto (2967 m), Kuşaklı Dağı (1947 m), Avcı Dağı (2121 m), Meydanok Tepesi (2042 m), Kortepe (2082 m) and Raman Dağı (1288 m). Several rivers ( or ) flow through the province, including Tigris, Batman, Sason and Garzan. The historic Malabadi Bridge (built in 1146–1147) crosses the river near the town of Silvan. The Tigris flows from west to east, merges with the Batman River and exits the province. The Garzan River flowing from north to south enters the Tigris and separates Batman from the Siirt Province lying to the east. The province is also of interest from an archaeological point of view. Sights include the Imam Abdullah Dervish monastery, the bridge of Camiü‘r Rızk and Hasankeyf.

Districts

The province is divided into six districts:
 Batman
 Beşiri
 Gercüş
 Hasankeyf
 Kozluk
 Sason

There are 289 villages in the province.

Demographics 

The population of the province is rapidly growing as a result of the inflow of workforce to the capital. Between 1990 and 2000, its population was rising at a rate of 5% per year. The population was stable in Beşiri and Gercüş, increasing by 1% per year in Kozluk and Sason and decreasing by 3% per year in Hasankeyf. The total population was 608,659 in 2019 with 460,955 people living in the urban areas, mostly in the capital. It was 49.8% female.

Oil industry
Search for oil in the Batman Province was started in 1935. On 20 April 1940, oil was found at a depth of 1048 meters at the Raman oil field, south-east of Batman, nearby the city. The first experimental well started producing 10 tonnes (about 62 barrels) per day from 6 June 1940.

The field was expanded for commercial production by 1945, but the production was delayed to 1947 by the lack of storage. A small refinery was built at the site with a capacity of 9 tonnes/day by 1947 and by November 1948 a bigger refinery capable of processing up to 200 tonnes/day was built in Batman. Even bigger refinery (330 tonnes/d) was built in Batman by 1955. Several other oil fields were later discovered in the province with the Batı Raman oil field, which produces about 7,000 barrels daily, being the largest oil field in Turkey. The pipeline has an annual capacity of 3.5 million tonnes and was transporting about 20 million barrels (about 2.7 million tonnes) in the 1990s and about twice less between 2003 and 2007. Another, short pipeline connected Batman with Şelmo – the location of the second largest oil field in Turkey. It was transferring between 1.5 and 0.5 million barrels per year in the period 1990–2007. Both pipelines are operated by BOTAŞ.

Batman dam
The Batman dam construction was started in 1986 and completed in 1999. It has a height of 85 meters and annual power generation capacity of 483 GWh (peak power 198 MW). The associated reservoir has a surface area of 49 km2 and a volume of 1.175 km3.

Famous personalities
Karapetê Xaço (1900–August 2005) – traditional singer of Kurdish Dengbêj music
Cigerxwîn (1903–1984) – Kurdish poet, writer, journalist, historian, lexicographer and nationalist.
Ali Rıza Alan (born 1947) – wrestler
Ibrahim Bilgen (1949–2010) – politician, electrical engineer and activist. 
Hüseyin Kalkan (born 1950) – former mayor of Batman city
Hüseyin Velioğlu (1952–2000) – leader of the Kurdish Hezbollah
Mehmet Şimşek (born 1967) – politician, former Minister of Finance of Turkey
Nalin Pekgul (born 1967) – politician
Ayşe Acar Başaran (born 1985) – politician
Mehmet Demir – politician
Alan Ciwan – actor
Şehmus Hazer – professional basketball player
Sevgi Yorulmaz (born 1982) – Paralympic archer
Mansur Çalar (born 1986) – footballer
Nurullah Kaya (born 1986) – footballer
Ahmet Arı (born 1989) – footballer
Erdal Akdarı (born 1993) – footballer
Mizgin Ay (born 2000) – track and field athlete

See also
 Ilısu Dam Campaign
 Sasun Resistance (1894)
 Sasun Uprising (1904)
 Southeastern Anatolia Project
 List of populated places in Batman Province
Yazidis

References

External links

 Maps of Kurdish Regions by GlobalSecurity.org
 Map of Kurdish Population Distribution by GlobalSecurity.org

 
Provinces of Turkey
Turkish Kurdistan